Mobberley is a village in Cheshire, England, between Wilmslow and Knutsford, which in 2001 had a population of 2,546, increasing to 3,050 at the 2011 Census.

Mobberley railway station is on the Manchester to Chester line. Manchester Airport lies to the north of the village.

History
Mobberley is mentioned, as Motburlege, in the Domesday Book of 1086. A priory was located here.

The parish church, St Wilfrid's, was mainly constructed around 1245. It was originally dedicated to both St Wilfrid and St Mary although in recent years St Mary has been "dropped".

Hill House is a 17th-century black and white timbered framed house that was originally in Woodlane Mobberley. It was the home of the Bacon family. The house was deconstructed and rebuilt on Nursery Lane in Nether Alderley to avoid destruction by the building of the second runway at Manchester Airport. The Grade-II-listed Hanson House, formerly the home of the Riddick family, was similarly relocated due to the runway construction, and is now on Moss Lane, Siddington. Antrobus Hall was built in 1709.

Mobberley was the home of the Mallory family: George Mallory (1886–1924), a mountaineer who died attempting Mount Everest, and  Air Chief Marshal Sir Trafford Leigh-Mallory (1892–1944), who was air commander for the Allied Invasion of Normandy during World War II were both born in Mobberley. Their father, The Rev. Herbert Leigh Mallory, was rector of Mobberley.

The Victory Hall was built in 1921 as a World War I memorial at a cost of £4,500 on a plot of three quarters of an acre given by Mr R O Leycester. It was officially opened on 30 December 1921 and was refurbished in 1992. It is also home to many village organisations including the Women's Institute, Village Society and playgroup and is a regular place for locals – and wider – to hold a variety of celebrations and meetings.

Mobberley has seen much change in recent years: first the opening of the nearby M56 from Manchester to Chester and then the Second Runway at Manchester Airport. These developments have led to Mobberley becoming largely a dormitory village of Manchester. Mobberley is well served by pubs.

Mobberley is mentioned in the opening chapter of the children's fantasy novel The Weirdstone of Brisingamen by Alan Garner.

Sports
Mobberley has a cricket club which plays at Church Lane. The first team competes in Division two of the Cheshire County Cricket League; it also has a second and third teams, and a junior section.

Crown green bowls and snooker are played at the Victory Hall Memorial Club.

Notable people
 David Briggs, Lord Lieutenant of Cheshire (2010–2021), has lived at Dukenfield Hall in Mobberley since 1987.
 Dave Dee, vocalist in 1960s hit recording group Dave Dee, Dozy, Beaky, Mick & Tich (formerly Dave Dee & The Bostons)
 Chris Farnell, sports lawyer, lives in Mobberley.
 ACM Sir Trafford Leigh-Mallory, Commander-in-Chief of RAF Fighter Command in World War II
 George Mallory, English mountaineer, who died in his attempt to be the first to reach the summit of Mount Everest

See also

 Listed buildings in Mobberley
 Mobberley Old Hall
 Newton Hall, Mobberley

Notes and references

External links

 www.mobberley.info. Retrieval Date: October 12, 2007.
 St. Wilfrid's Parish Church Website. Retrieval Date: October 12, 2007.

Villages in Cheshire
Civil parishes in Cheshire